The 1950–51 Copa México was the 35th staging of the Copa México, the 8th staging in the professional era.

The competition started on May 6, 1951, and concluded on May 27, 1951, with the final, in which Atlante lifted the trophy for the second time ever with a 1–0 victory over Guadalajara.

This edition was played only by 12 teams, in a knock-out stage, in a single match.

First round

Played between May 6 and May 8

|}

Bye: Marte and Necaxa

Quarterfinals

Played May 13

|}

Bye: Atlante

Play-off

Played May 15

|}

Semifinals

Played May 20

|}

Play-off

Played May 22

|}

Final

Played May 27

|}

References
Mexico - Statistics of Copa México in season 1950/1951. (RSSSF)

1950-51
1950–51 in Mexican football
1950–51 domestic association football cups